The Ouanne is an  long river in central France, a right tributary of the Loing.

It flows generally northwest, and joins the Loing in Conflans-sur-Loing, near Amilly.

It crosses the following departments and towns:
Yonne: Ouanne, Leugny, Moulins-sur-Ouanne, Toucy, Dracy, Villiers-Saint-Benoît, Grandchamp, Saint-Denis-sur-Ouanne, Malicorne, Saint-Martin-sur-Ouanne, Charny, Chêne-Arnoult
Loiret: Douchy, Triguères, Château-Renard, Gy-les-Nonains, Saint-Germain-des-Prés, Conflans-sur-Loing

References

Rivers of France
Rivers of Bourgogne-Franche-Comté
Rivers of Centre-Val de Loire
Rivers of Yonne
Rivers of Loiret